Compositeurs et Chansons de Paris is a French short film directed by Henri Verneuil in 1951.

Synopsis 
Little known to the general public for the benefit of the performers, composers present a sample of their talent through several songs.

Songs

Production 
When the narrator of the short film presents the various composers, he hums songs that the composers have written in their career :

Anecdotes 
Henri Betti and Louiguy made their musical studies at the Conservatoire de Paris in the same class.

Rose Avril and Lucienne Delyle recorded on disc the songs they sing in this short film unlike Marie-Laurence, Jacques Pills and Maria Vincent.

References

External links 

1951 short films
1951 films
French black-and-white films
French short films
French musical films
1951 musical films
1950s French films